The Grand Rapids, Lansing and Detroit Railroad is a defunct, nineteenth century railroad, formerly operating in Michigan. Incorporated May 17, 1887, it built a 53-mile line from Grand Rapids, Michigan to Grand Ledge, as well as the Ramona Branch, both of which it leased to the Detroit, Lansing and Northern Railroad. 
The former still exists as part of the Canadian National Railway line into Grand Rapids, Michigan.

References

Defunct Michigan railroads
Railway companies established in 1887
Railway companies disestablished in 1897
Predecessors of the Pere Marquette Railway